The Imagineering Foundation is a British charity organisation that encourages schoolchildren aged 8–16 to engage with engineering.

History

It was formed in 1999 by a group of Midlands engineers who were concerned about a perceived lowering of interest in engineering activities by schoolchildren, leading to a skills shortage in the STEM subjects. It was launched as an educational charity on 31 July 2001.

The website was developed in 2004, with educational material for the clubs.

Structure
It is based in Warwickshire. It also has a substantial online presence with a website built so tutors can access project material.

Function

Clubs
It currently organizes 147 engineering clubs mostly in England, but with two in Wales and five in Scotland. Most of the clubs are in the West Midlands, and to a lesser extent in the East Midlands (Northamptonshire). Each week, around 1800 children take part in the clubs.

It publishes a magazine called The Imagineer.

Fairs
It hosts children's engineering fairs at the Royal Bath and West Show, the Royal International Air Tattoo at RAF Fairford, and the International Air Day at RNAS Yeovilton. These events are often attended by people (parents) already interested in engineering - the organization's target audience.

See also
 Manufacturing in the United Kingdom
 Science, Technology, Engineering and Mathematics Network

References

External links
 Imagineering Foundation

1999 establishments in the United Kingdom
Children's festivals in the United Kingdom
Educational charities based in the United Kingdom
Engineering education in the United Kingdom
Engineering organizations
Organisations based in Warwickshire
Organizations established in 1999
Science and technology in the United Kingdom
Science education in the United Kingdom
Kenilworth